is a series of animated shorts released in theaters and as original video animation between 1988 and 1993 by Sunrise.  Part of the SD Gundam media franchise, the anime was based on the popular Gashapon capsule toys and model kits being released by Bandai at the time.

The shorts initially parody stories and characters from the Gundam franchise with super deformed forms of Gundam characters and mecha.  Starting with 1989's Mobile Suit SD Gundam's Counterattack, the series began featuring a regularly appearing set of SD Gundam characters based on existing SD Gundam toys, Carddass trading cards and manga series, notably from the Command Gundam, Knight Gundam, and Musha Gundam sub-franchises.

Works
Mobile Suit SD Gundam was released as a series of shorts accompanying feature films by Sunrise, or in OVA form.  Eventually a feature film and a TV series were also made.  The complete list of works are as follows:

  (theatrical shorts, March 1988) 
Released with Mobile Suit Gundam: Char's Counterattack.  Contains the following shorts:

The video release includes the two shorts from the theatrical release above, in addition to a new episode: 

  (OVA, June 1989)
Includes the following shorts:

 (omake)

  (theatrical shorts, July 1989)
Released with Patlabor: The Movie.  First animated appearance of the SD Sengokuden sub-series, which is based on the Musha Gundam toy line.  Includes the following shorts:

  (OVA, March 1990)
Includes the following shorts:

  (OVA, September 1990)
Includes the following shorts:
.  Based on the American cartoon, Wacky Races.  Due to copyright issues, this short was never released on DVD.

Appendix Part One: The One Year War Mobile Suit Catalog
  (OVA, October 1990)
Includes the following shorts:

  (OVA, March 1990 to March 1991)
A series of four OVAs adapted from the manga series, SD Gundam Gaiden Sieg Zion Hen, featuring Knight Gundam:

 (theatrical short, March 1991) 
Released with Mobile Suit Gundam F91.  Features the first ever team-up of Command Gundam, Knight Gundam, Musha Gundam, who work together with a young girl named Riplin to fight evil.  Video release contains SD Gundam Scramble along with two new segments:

 (live-action omake introducing the different members of the SD Command Chronicles team, G-ARMS)
  (movie, March 1993)
A feature-length movie divided into multiple parts as follows:
.  A teamup between various teams from SD Command Chronicles: SD Command Chronicles II's "Crushers" and SD Command Chronicles III's "Super G-Arms" and the Super Knight Final Formula.
 & .  Adaptation of the Knight Gundam Cardass and manga story, Seikihei Monogatari.

Releases 
An 8-episode TV series, was aired on TV Tokyo from February to March 1993, compiling the various Mobile Suit SD Gundam shorts as well as some variety segments.  The show achieved a TV rating of 8.06% in the Kanto region.

All of the animated shorts, with the exception of SD Gundam SD Wacky Races, were later re-released in a DVD-BOX in Japan on July 22, 2007.

References

External links

Official sites
 Mobile Suit SD Gundam Web (Japanese)
 Gundam

SD Gundam
Sunrise (company)
1990 anime OVAs